Richard Montpetit (born 11 October 1939) is a Canadian gymnast. He competed in seven events at the 1960 Summer Olympics.

References

1939 births
Living people
Canadian male artistic gymnasts
Olympic gymnasts of Canada
Gymnasts at the 1960 Summer Olympics
People from Verdun, Quebec
Gymnasts from Montreal
Pan American Games medalists in gymnastics
Pan American Games silver medalists for Canada
Pan American Games bronze medalists for Canada
Gymnasts at the 1959 Pan American Games
Gymnasts at the 1963 Pan American Games
Medalists at the 1959 Pan American Games
Medalists at the 1963 Pan American Games
20th-century Canadian people
21st-century Canadian people